Pieter Both, sometimes referred to as Peter Botte Mountain, is the second highest mountain of Mauritius, at  tall. The mountain is shorter than Piton de la Petite Rivière Noire by eight metres. It is named after Pieter Both, the first Governor-General of the Dutch East Indies. It is located in the Moka Range.

The notable feature of this mountain is the gigantic rock formation at the very top of it, which resembles a human head. The palm species Hyophorbe amaricaulis, famous for being the world's rarest palm today, was once a common sight on this mountain.

The first ascent of Pieter Both was by Captain Lloyd, Lieutenant Phillpotts, of the 29th Reg., Lieutenant Keppel, R.N., and Lieutenant Taylor on 7 September 1832.

To climb the mountain following the main ridge takes about an hour, and is mildly difficult. It is mainly a scramble, and being exposed, a rope is advised. The dramatic boulder on the pinnacle is about nine metres in diameter, and has several iron spikes fixed to it to aid climbing to the top. The top is flat and about two metres across.

References
 

Mountains of Mauritius